NIHE or Nihe may refer to:

 National Institute for Higher Education in the Republic of Ireland
 Northern Ireland Housing Executive
 Niya (kingdom), an old kingdom in the current Syria
 Nihe, Huainan, a town in Panji District, Huainan
Nihe, Hefei, a town in Lujiang County, Hefei